Rahmanniyeh (also Romanized as Raḩmānnīyeh and Raḩmānīyeh) is a village in Shahrabad Rural District, Shahrabad District, Bardaskan County, Razavi Khorasan Province, Iran. At the 2006 census, its population was 150, in 38 families.

References 

Populated places in Bardaskan County